Derek Fathauer (born January 20, 1986) is an American professional golfer who has played on the PGA Tour and the Web.com Tour.

Fathauer was born in Stuart, Florida. He attended Martin County High School in Stuart, Florida. He and his twin brother Daryl played in the Ginn sur Mer Classic in October 2007, the first twins to do so in a PGA Tour event.

Amateur career
Fathauer qualified for the 2008 U.S. Open. He qualified by coming in a tie for third, shooting 67-68, in a sectional qualifying event at the OSU golf club, Scarlet Course. In the qualifying stage, he finished ahead of veterans such as Davis Love III and Jesper Parnevik. In the U.S. Open played at Torrey Pines Golf Course in San Diego, California, he shot 73-73 to make the cut by 4 strokes. He was, through two rounds, the lowest amateur score in the field, edging Michael Thompson by one stroke and Rickie Fowler by three strokes. However, he struggled on the weekend, shooting 78-75 to finish in a tie for 69th at +15 and in third for the amateurs.

Fathauer had much success at the U.S. Amateur throughout the years. In 2006, he made the first round of match play at Hazeltine National Golf Club, located in Chaska, Minnesota. In 2007, he made the quarterfinals. In 2008, he also made the quarterfinals, beating Kevin Tway. However his road to the quarterfinals was not easy. He required 20 holes to win in the round of 32 and 22 holes in the round of 16 before losing to runner-up Drew Kittleson in the quarters.

Fathauer was also a member of the United States Palmer Cup team. During the cup, he won a team high three points. However, team USA lost the event 14-10 to the European squad.

Professional career
Fathauer turned professional on September 17, 2008. He advanced to the final stage of the 2008 PGA Tour Q-School in La Quinta, California at the PGA West Golf Community. He earned his Tour card for 2009 after finishing in a tie for second. Fathauer finished eight shots behind Harrison Frazar after shooting 70-69-65-67-67-70 for a total score of 408.

Fathauer made his professional PGA Tour debut at the Sony Open in Hawaii on January 15, 2009, where he missed the cut by one stroke after shooting a 73-69=142 (+2). He made his first cut on Tour at the AT&T Pebble Beach National Pro-Am. He shot 71-71-69=211 to make the cut. During the tournament, he also recorded his first ace of his professional career at the 15th hole of Spyglass Hill Golf Course, in Pebble Beach, California.

Fathauer earned his first professional win at the 2014 Web.com Tour Championship. The win made Fathauer fully exempt on the PGA Tour for the 2014–15 season for leading the Web.com Tour Finals money list. He also earned an invitation to the 2015 Players Championship.

Professional wins (1)

Web.com Tour wins (1)

Web.com Tour playoff record (0–1)

Results in major championships

CUT = missed the halfway cut
"T" indicates a tie for a place.

Results in The Players Championship

CUT = missed the halfway cut
"T" indicates a tie for a place

U.S. national team appearances
Amateur
Palmer Cup: 2008

See also
2008 PGA Tour Qualifying School graduates
2014 Web.com Tour Finals graduates
2015 Web.com Tour Finals graduates

External links
University of Louisville profile

Fathauer turns pro
Fathauer at the U.S. Open

American male golfers
Louisville Cardinals men's golfers
PGA Tour golfers
Korn Ferry Tour graduates
Golfers from Florida
American twins
Twin sportspeople
Martin County High School alumni
People from Stuart, Florida
People from Jensen Beach, Florida
1986 births
Living people